The 1995–96 B Group was the fortieth season of the Bulgarian B Football Group, the second tier of the Bulgarian football league system. A total of 20 teams contested the league.

League table

Top scorers

References

External links 
 1995–96 Bulgarian B Group season

Bul
1995-96
2